Conversations with Myself is a 1963 album by American jazz musician Bill Evans.

History
Recording with Glenn Gould's piano, CD 318, at studio sessions on February 6 and 9, and May 20, 1963, Evans used the method of overdubbing three different yet corresponding piano tracks for each song. The album features mostly traditional pop standards. Alongside these are three compositions by Thelonious Monk, and one Evans original, "N.Y.C.'s No Lark", commemorating Evans' friend and fellow jazz pianist Sonny Clark, who died one month before Evans began work on the album.

Evans followed Conversations with Myself with Further Conversations with Myself (1967) and New Conversations (1978), both recorded in a similar vein.

Critical reception

The album earned Evans his first Grammy Award in 1964 for Best Jazz Instrumental Album, Individual or Group. It received a 5-star review in DownBeat in 1963.

Writing for Allmusic, music critic Michael G. Nastos wrote: Certainly one of the more unusual items in the discography of an artist whose consistency is as evident as any in modern jazz, and nothing should dissuade you from purchasing this one of a kind album that in some ways set a technological standard for popular music – and jazz – to come.  Jason Laipply of All About Jazz wrote: [The album] was an instant classic for the jazz community. Evans' work on the ten tunes included here is truly inspired and amazing to behold... this glimpse of the artist at a heightened level of expression is very rewarding indeed. However, for the casual fan, I would not suggest this disc. The musical vocabulary is complex enough that the simple beauty of the songs, and Evans’ playing, is at times lost.

Track listing

"'Round Midnight" (Monk, Williams) – 6:35
"How About You?" (Lane, Ralph Freed) – 2:50
"Spartacus Love Theme" (Alex North) – 5:10
"Blue Monk" (Monk) – 4:32
"Stella by Starlight" (Young, Washington) – 4:52
"Hey There" (Richard Adler, Ross) – 4:31
"N.Y.C.'s No Lark" (Bill Evans) – 5:36
"Just You, Just Me" (Jesse Greer, Raymond Klages) – 2:37
"Bemsha Swing" (Denzil Best, Monk) – 2:56
"A Sleepin' Bee" (Arlen, Capote) – 4:10

Tracks 9 and 10 not part of original LP release. Track 7 recorded on February 6, 1963; tracks 1, 2, 5, 6, 8-10 on February 9; tracks 3 and 4 recorded on May 20, 1963.

Personnel
Bill Evans - piano (multi-tracked)
Creed Taylor - producer

References

External links
Jazz Discography entries for Bill Evans
Bill Evans Memorial Library discography

1963 albums
Verve Records albums
Bill Evans albums
Albums produced by Creed Taylor
Grammy Hall of Fame Award recipients
Grammy Award for Best Jazz Instrumental Album